Nashville is a town in Nash County, North Carolina, United States. The town was founded in 1780 and features Victorian and Queen Anne style homes. It is part of the Rocky Mount, North Carolina Metropolitan Statistical Area. The population of Nashville was 5,632 in 2020. It is the county seat of Nash County. The town and its county were named for Francis Nash, an officer of the North Carolina militia who died in the American Revolutionary War.

History
The Bissette-Cooley House, Nash County Courthouse, Nashville Historic District, and Rose Hill are listed on the National Register of Historic Places.

Geography

Demographics

2020 census

As of the 2020 United States census, there were 5,632 people, 2,284 households, and 1,423 families residing in the town.

2000 census
As of the census of 2000, there were 4,309 people, 1,629 households, and 1,124 families residing in the town. The population density was 1,425.2 people per square mile (550.9/km2). There were 1,751 housing units at an average density of 579.1 per square mile (223.9/km2). The racial makeup of the town was 54.82% White, 43.10% African American, 0.30% Native American, 0.58% Asian, 0.60% from other races, and 0.60% from two or more races. Hispanic or Latino of any race were 1.25% of the population.

There were 1,629 households, out of which 32.5% had children under the age of 18 living with them, 48.4% were married couples living together, 16.7% had a female householder with no husband present, and 31.0% were non-families. 28.4% of all households were made up of individuals, and 11.8% had someone living alone who was 65 years of age or older. The average household size was 2.43 and the average family size was 2.98.

In the town, the population was spread out, with 23.7% under the age of 18, 7.1% from 18 to 24, 30.4% from 25 to 44, 22.5% from 45 to 64, and 16.3% who were 65 years of age or older. The median age was 38 years. For every 100 females, there were 89.2 males. For every 100 females age 18 and over, there were 84.4 males.

The median income for a household in the town was $36,371, and the median income for a family was $44,180. Males had a median income of $32,282 versus $22,176 for females. The per capita income for the town was $18,603. About 9.5% of families and 10.5% of the population were below the poverty line, including 10.0% of those under age 18 and 15.6% of those age 65 or over.

Arts and culture

Each spring, the Nashville Blooming Festival is held and is a major event for the town. The main street is blocked off for carnival rides, vendors, and local business participation. The Nashville Chamber of Commerce produces this event. Local musicians perform outdoors. Nash Arts, which holds arts and cultural events year-round, helps with hosting portions of the Blooming Festival.

Notable people
 Archibald Hunter Arrington, United States Congressman from North Carolina, born near Nashville
 J. J. Arrington, former NFL running back, born in Nashville
 Harold D. Cooley, United States Congressman from North Carolina, born in Nashville, Cooley is the longest-serving Chairman of the House Committee on Agriculture in history. 
 Roy Cooper, Governor of North Carolina, born in Nashville
 Algenon L. Marbley Federal District Court Judge Southern District of Ohio, raised partly in Nashville 
 Phil Valentine, nationally syndicated talk radio host and movie producer, raised in Nashville.
 Tim Valentine, United States Congressman from North Carolina, lived and practiced law in Nashville.  Phil Valentine was his son.

References

External links
 Town website

Towns in Nash County, North Carolina
County seats in North Carolina